Rogelio Crespo Hernández (September 16, 1894 – August 27, 1985) was a Cuban baseball second baseman in the Negro leagues. He played professionally from 1918 to 1933 with several ballclubs, including the Cuban Stars (East), Cuban Stars of Havana, Gilkerson's Union Giants, and the Chicago Giants.

References

External links
 and Baseball-Reference Black Baseball stats and Seamheads

1894 births
1985 deaths
Chicago Giants players
Cuban Stars (East) players
Cuban baseball players